This list of aircraft at the Imperial War Museum Duxford summarises the collection of aircraft that is housed at the Imperial War Museum Duxford in Cambridgeshire, England. Note the list does not include aircraft owned by The Fighter Collection and the Historic Aircraft Collection, two private operators of airworthy aircraft which are also based at Duxford.

Imperial War Museum Collection
Aircraft on display that are the property or on loan to the Imperial War Museum

American Air Museum
Aircraft owned or on loan to the Imperial War Museum and displayed in the American Air Museum

Duxford Aviation Society
Aircraft owned or on loan to the Duxford Aviation Society

See also
The Fighter Collection

References

Aerospace museums in England
Imperial War Museum Duxford
Collection of the Imperial War Museum